Synaptojanin-2-binding protein is a protein that in humans is encoded by the SYNJ2BP gene.

Interactions 

SYNJ2BP has been shown to interact with:
 ACVR2A, 
 ACVR2B, 
 LRP1, and
 LRP2.

References

Further reading